The Volkswagen Golf Mk1 is the first generation of a small family car manufactured and marketed by Volkswagen. It was noteworthy for signalling Volkswagen's shift of its major car lines from rear-wheel drive and rear-mounted air-cooled engines to front-wheel drive with front-mounted, water-cooled engines that were often transversely-mounted.

Successor to Volkswagen's Beetle, the first generation Golf debuted in Europe in May 1974 with styling by Giorgetto Giugiaro's Italdesign.

History

Replacing the Beetle; early efforts

Volkswagen began producing prototypes of possible Beetle replacements as far back as the early 1950s, and may have received design proposals from Porsche earlier than that. All of the internal projects' names started with "EA", standing for "Entwicklungsauftrag" and meaning "Development assignment". This work began during the tenure of Heinz Nordhoff, who was Director General of Volkswagen from 1948 to 1968.

In 1952 the company built the EA41 in collaboration with Pininfarina. Essentially a rebodied Beetle, it never went into production.

The first EA47 prototype appeared in 1953; at least 11 more EA47 variations were built over the next three years.

By the mid- to late-1950s, questions about the future of the Beetle began to be asked from outside the company. In 1957, an article with the title "Is the Volkswagen dated?" appeared in the West German magazine Stern. Two years later, a similar headline was used in an article in Der Spiegel weekly news.

In 1958 Porsche began a project numbered 728 for a revised Beetle. A few years later this became the Volkswagen EA53. This project continued for a number of years and produced several prototypes, with early ones having bodywork designed by Porsche and later ones styled by Ghia. The EA53 eventually led to the Type 3 model.

In 1957 another design study, the EA97, was started. This exercise was larger than the Beetle, but kept the usual rear-mounted powertrain. Two hundred instances of this design were built. Styling varied, depending on whether a particular car's bodywork was done by VW or by Ghia. Some cars’ looks echo the later Type 3 cars, although the EA97 was smaller. The last EA97 was built in 1960. The EA97 would provide the basis for the Brasília model from Volkswagen do Brasil.

The EA158 was a Beetle-successor project that started in 1962 with a unibody study by Pininfarina. As the project progressed the car grew in size and weight. Eventually it was rejected as a Beetle replacement, but served as the foundation of the subsequent 411 model.

In 1967 another set of prototypes for possible Beetle replacements appeared in the form of the EA235 and EA235a.

In 1968 the last internal prototype for a Beetle replacement built under Nordhoff's direction appeared. This car, designated EA276, was a small three-door hatchback with front-wheel drive using a front-mounted Volkswagen air-cooled engine. The EA276 program was cancelled after the death of Nordhoff, but did find new life as the inspiration for the Brazilian Gol.

During Nordhoff's time VW did broaden its product line with the launch of the VW 1500 in 1961 and the 411 in 1968. In 1964 the company acquired control of the Auto Union group from Daimler-Benz and with it the technologies of the constituent companies of DKW, Horch, Audi and Wanderer.

Corporate changes and later prototypes
Kurt Lotz succeeded Nordhoff as Director General of Volkswagen from 1968 to 1971. Work to broaden the product line and find a replacement for the Beetle accelerated. Under Lotz Volkswagen acquired control of NSU in 1969. NSU was subsequently merged into the Auto Union group. One outcome of this acquisition was that the mid-sized front-wheel drive car that had been under development at NSU would reach the market, not as an NSU, but as the Volkswagen K70.

In 1968 another development project started named EA266. This project originated with Porsche, where it began as an internal project as early as 1966. This unusual design used a rear mid-engine, rear-wheel-drive layout with a water-cooled inline four cylinder engine laid over on its side and mounted longitudinally under the floor of the rear of the passenger compartment.

In 1969, one year after the start of work at Volkswagen on the EA266, another project named EA337 was commissioned. This project would draw on engines and front-wheel drive technology from the Audi division of Auto Union.

Entering difficult times
In 1966 Volkswagen built almost 1.5 million automobiles and reported net profits of DM300,000,000. By 1967 domestic sales had fallen to 370,000 units from a high of 600,000 units in 1965. A government-backed economic stimulus package was able to produce a rebound in sales. Beetle exports to the United States went from 232,550 in 1963 to 423,008 in 1968.

Local competitors Ford of Europe and Opel launched new small car models targeted directly at Volkswagen's traditional market. Volkswagen's share of the German domestic car market dropped from 45% in 1960 to 26% in 1972.

Profits fell from a high of DM330,000,000 in 1969 to DM12,000,000 in 1971, mainly due to slumping Beetle sales and high R&D costs.

In 1971 the United States' government ended international convertibility of the US dollar to gold in what is termed the Nixon shock. One outcome of this was that the Deutsche Mark rose 40% against the US dollar in 1971. This, combined with a 10% import duty on cars entering the US, caused Beetle sales to plummet in what had become a critical market for Volkswagen. In 1973 the OPEC oil crisis hit, triggering a global recession. The German government responded with emergency measures banning private car use on certain days of the week and comprehensive speed limits.

In 1972 Opel's share of the German market rose to 20.4%, making them Germany's largest automobile manufacturer and overtaking Volkswagen in their domestic market.

In 1972 the Center for Auto Safety published "Small—on safety: the designed-in dangers of the Volkswagen", which examined the safety deficiencies of the Beetle just as Ralph Nader's earlier book Unsafe at Any Speed had done for the Chevrolet Corvair.

All of the foregoing combined to result in Volkswagen posting a DM807,000,000 loss in 1974. In the same year Volkswagen of America alone posted a DM200,000,000 loss.

Rudolf Leiding replaced Lotz as Director General of Volkswagen from 1971 to 1975. Commenting on the situation at Volkswagen as he found it, Leiding said: "The global situation for VW was more critical than we had once thought – to put it simply, we were dealing with the survival of a giant group, which employed more than 220,000 people worldwide ..."

Two weeks after assuming the directorship, Leiding stopped work on the Porsche-designed EA266 and ordered all but two of the 50 prototypes built to that point to be destroyed.

Model history

In 1969 Lotz and Italian Volkswagen importer Gerhard R. Gumpert visited the Turin Auto Show. After selecting their six favourite cars of the show, they discovered that four of the six were designed by Giorgetto Giugiaro and his Italdesign studio.

Giugiaro was invited to Wolfsburg in January 1970 to work on development project EA337. The first thing he saw when he arrived at VW's research centre was a Fiat 128, completely disassembled and labelled. The design brief provided by Volkswagen specified a C-segment car with a two-box body in three- and five-door versions. The client also provided Giugiaro with the basic dimensions and the power-train options.

Giugiaro produced a design that reflected his signature "origami" or "folded-paper" style, emphasizing sharp corners and flat planes. Giugiaro would come to consider the Mk1 Golf the most important design of his career. Early prototypes included rectangular headlamps and wide tail-lamp assemblies. At least one pre-production car was modified with a sliding side door.

During development, candidates for the name of the new car included "Blizzard" and "Caribe", but these lost out to the final choice of "Golf". The origin of the name is variously attributed to the game of golf, the Gulf Stream current (German "Golfstrom") or the name of a horse.

The Golf Mk1 received VW model designation Type 17. Production started in March 1974, and sales officially began in May 1974. By this time Giugiaro's rectangular headlamps and wide tail-lamps had given way to round headlamps and much narrower rear lamps. On these earliest cars the lower horizontal bodyline running under the tail-lamps on the rear hatch dropped down in the location of the rear license plate. This feature has been dubbed "Swallowtail" by some Golf enthusiasts. The surface between the raised sides on the bonnet on early cars also blended smoothly into the leading edge.

The Golf was not the first example of Giugiaro's work for Volkswagen to reach production. His design for the first generation Passat was released in 1973, and the first generation Scirocco, a Giugiaro design prepared concurrently with the Golf, was released months ahead of the Golf.

The right-hand drive Golf went on sale in Britain in October 1974. For the 1975 sales year it was the 14th best selling car in Britain with more than 19,000 units sold. In 1981 the facelifted Golf GTI was voted Car of the Year by What Car? magazine, ahead of all-new models like the Austin Metro and MK3 Ford Escort. In its final sales year of 1983 it sold more than 25,000 units and was Britain's 14th best selling car despite being almost 10 years old.

Air conditioning became available as an option on the domestic market in August 1975. The ability to retrofit the system, together with installing a larger battery, was offered to owners of existing cars.

In December 1975 a minor styling revision deleted the Swallowtail line on the rear hatch, replacing it with a simple straight horizontal body-line. The bonnet also received a transverse line connecting the two raised sides across the front edge of the panel.

The Golf was introduced to Japan in 1975, where it was imported by the Yanase dealership chain. Its exterior dimensions and engine displacement were in compliance with Japanese Government dimension regulations, which helped sales.

The Golf Mk1 was runner-up for European Car of the Year in 1975, losing to the Citroën CX.

A minor exterior revision in December 1978 replaced the narrow front and rear bumpers with moulded units that wrapped around the sides of the car. Another minor facelift in 1980 saw the adoption of wider rear lamp clusters and a new dashboard with a more modern-looking instrument display featuring LED warning lights. US versions also received rectangular headlights. This was the last major update before the MK1 was replaced by the MK2 Golf in most markets in September 1983 and in the British market in March 1984.

The Golf was West Germany's best selling new car for much of its production life, and was among the most successful cars in the whole of Europe during its nine-year production run.

Features
The Golf adopted an efficient "two-box" layout with a steep hatchback rather than a formal trunk. The chassis was a steel unibody.

The car's engine was mounted transversely in the front, and drove the front wheels. Engines from two Audi engine families were offered. Both were water cooled inline four cylinder four-stroke engines. Both also had two valves per cylinder operated by a single-overhead camshaft driven by a timing belt. The early engines used 2 barrel Zenith carburetors. The 1.1 L and 1.3 L engines were from the original EA111 line. In this engine the valves were operated by rocker arms. The EA111 was mounted with a 20° forward tilt. The 1.5 L, 1.6 L and 1.8 L engines were from the EA827 family. In this engine the valves were operated by bucket tappets. The EA827s were mounted tilted 15° rearwards.

The car was originally available with two transmission options; a four-speed manual and a three-speed automatic. A five-speed manual became available in 1979.

The front suspension was made up of MacPherson struts and helical coil springs with lower wishbones and an anti-roll bar. The rear was semi-independent with dual trailing arms connected by a twist-beam rear suspension and coil springs over telescopic shock absorbers.

Steering was by rack-and-pinion.

Front brakes were  disks with solid rotors. In the rear were  drums.

The car's tires varied with the power-train, with 145SR13 Pirelli Cinturato on the 1.1, and 155SR13s on the 1.3 and 1.5. Tires on the GTIs were larger, with 175/70R13s on the 1.6 GTI and 175/70HR13 Pirelli Cinturato CN36 on the 1.8.

Technical data

Mk1 Derivative models

Golf GTI

Due to the negative political reaction to the 1973 release of the Beetle "Gelb-Schwarzer Renner" ("GSR", or "Yellow-Black Racer"), Volkswagen had little inclination to develop a faster Golf.

VW Press Department head Anton Konrad and VW engineer Alfons Löwenberg began development of a high-performance "Sport Golf" as a skunkworks project rather than as an official factory program. The two were joined by Gunter Kühl from the Press department, suspension expert Herbert Schuster, Hermann Hablitzel, who smuggled parts from the project into regular tests, Jürgen Adler, whose chassis analysis led to additional reinforcements, Horst-Dieter Schwittlinsky from the marketing department who coined the "GTI" acronym, and Franz Hauk, developer of the EA827 engine.

A prototype was built based on a Scirocco, rather than a Golf. This proof-of-concept had an EA827 engine with dual carburetors and a lowered and stiffened suspension. When this prototype was driven by Volkswagen's Chief of Research Ernst Fiala, he objected to the harsh suspension and excessive noise from the intake system and declared the car "undriveable".

The ad hoc development team arranged to use the fuel-injected version of the EA827 engine that had been developed for the new Audi 80 GTE. That engine's Bosch K-Jetronic system reduced intake noise and raised power output.

The car's name is typically described as an acronym of either the Italian phrase "Gran Turismo Iniezione", or the English "Grand Tourer Injection", and is usually written in all capitals.

The GTI was presented to Volkswagen's management early in 1975, and the project was approved 28 May 1975.

At this point a ninth person joined the original eight-member GTI team. Working under Chief designer Herbert Schäfer, Gunhild Liljequist was tasked with creating a set of features that would set the GTI's interior apart from the normal Golf. Her contributions included the bright Tartan plaid upholstery, and the dimpled golf ball-like gearshift knob.

The Golf GTI debuted in March 1975 at the Frankfurt Motor Show, and wasn't unveiled until the autumn of 1976.

Production was not expected to exceed 5000 units, which was the number needed to qualify for the Group One Production Touring Car class.

In addition to the modifications already mentioned, the GTI was distinguished from the stock Golf by external changes that included black-plastic wheel arch extensions to cover the 175/70HR13 tires on 5.5Jx13 wheels fitted, a larger front spoiler, a matte-black frame around the backlite and a red frame for the grille. Anti-roll bars were also fitted front and rear.

The engine in the early GTIs had a bore x stroke of  that displaced . The compression ratio had been raised to 9.5:1. This was mated to a close-ratio 4-speed manual transmission.

In August 1979 a 5-speed manual transmission became standard.

Compression had also been increased to 10.0:1.

The GTI appeared on the British market in 1977 as a special order only in left-hand drive form. A factory right-hand drive version finally became available in July 1979, priced at £4705. The Rabbit GTI did not arrive in the United States until the 1983 model year.

The 1976 Volkswagen Golf GTI is considered by many to be the archetypal "hot hatch", a class of sporty small cars popular in the 1970s and early 1980s, although cars of a generally similar concept, such as the 1967 Simca 1100 Ti and the 1971 Autobianchi A112 Abarth had appeared earlier.

Total production of Golf Mk1 GTIs eventually reached 462,000 units. In 2004, Sports Car International declared the Golf Mk1 GTI to be the 3rd best car of the 1980s.

GTI special editions
After the GTI was upgraded to 1.8 litres, special editions of the model were sold under different names in several European countries. These were distinguished externally by a quad-lamp front grille, tinted glass, factory sliding sunroof and Pirelli P 6Jx14 alloy wheels. The interior featured a leather-wrapped steering wheel, internal mirror adjusters and the MFA trip computer system.

The names of these editions, by country were:
 GTI Campaign (UK)
 GTI Pirelli (Germany)
 GTI Plus (France)
 GTI Trophy (Switzerland)
 GTI Special (Sweden, but without Pirelli wheels, these were fitted with Avus 14" rims)

Two additional special editions of the GTI were available in France and Norway. One was called the Golf GTI Rabbit. This model was a GTI with some normally standard equipment deleted, making it less expensive than the regular GTI.

The other French special edition, which pre-dated the 1.8 L GTI and was also available in Switzerland, was the Golf GTI 16 S Oettinger. GTIs were shipped from Germany to the Oettinger factory where they received, among other modifications, a 16-valve double-overhead cam cylinder head. The resulting engine developed .

Golf Diesel
A Golf powered by a normally aspirated diesel engine first appeared in September 1976. Equipping a compact car with a heavier, noisier and less powerful diesel engine was unusual in Germany at the time, with Peugeot among the few competitors offering a comparable model.

The diesel engine was derived from the existing EA827 Audi petrol engine. To withstand the higher stresses imposed by the diesel conversion, many engine components, including the cooling system, crankshaft, connecting rods, pistons and piston pins, cylinder head and timing belt, were reinforced or otherwise redesigned. Swirl chambers were added to the cylinder head. In the place previously occupied by the ignition distributor was a vacuum pump for the brake booster. The diesel injection pump was driven by the camshaft drive belt. The diesel engine was no larger than the 1.5-litre gasoline engine.

Early diesel engines had a displacement of 1.5 liters and developed the same  as the 1.3 litre petrol engine. Later engines displaced 1.6 liters and produced . The noise, vibration, and harshness (NVH) characteristics of the early diesels were still unsatisfactory. When the turbocharged  diesel engine appeared the turbo not only boosted the power output but dampened engine noise as well.

Rabbit Pickup/VW Caddy

A Golf-derived utility model with a pickup truck style rear bed was developed for the American market. This Mk1 variant was called the Rabbit Pickup in the US, and entered production in 1978 at the Westmoreland plant. An almost identical version for Europe called the VW Caddy went into production in 1983 at the Tvornica Automobila Sarajevo (TAS) plant in  Vogošća near Sarajevo, Yugoslavia. Approximately 200,000 units were produced at this location until the factory was destroyed in 1992 during the Bosnian War.

Jetta

In August 1979 a sedan version of the Golf called the Jetta was introduced. Essentially a Golf Mk1 with a trunk grafted on, this three-box sedan body style was offered in two- and four-door versions and was targeted at more conservative buyers. In North America the Jetta was a sales success, but sales numbers in Europe lagged behind expectations.

In 1980 Karmann produced a prototype of a convertible Jetta based on the 2-door body. Sales of the Jetta sedan did not justify putting the convertible into production.

Golf Cabriolet

A convertible version of the Golf was presented to Volkswagen's management by coachbuilder Wilhelm Karmann GmbH as early as 1976. This early prototype lacked the roll-over bar of the later version, and had a flat body line in the rear, where the soft top folded down below the sill level.

The production version of the convertible Golf was designated Type 155. In Europe and Canada it was called the Golf Cabriolet, while in the United States it was sold as the Rabbit Convertible until the 1985 model year. As the Rabbit was replaced by the Golf II in the United States, the Mark 1 Cabriolet was renamed simply "Volkswagen Cabriolet" (without either the Golf or Rabbit nameplate). The Cabriolet was sold from 1980 to 1994. It had a reinforced body, a transverse roll-over bar, and a high level of trim. From stamping to final assembly the Mk1 Cabriolet was built entirely at the Karmann factory. Volkswagen supplied engines, suspension, and interior trim for Karmann to install. The tops, of vinyl or cloth, were heavily insulated, with a heated glass rear window. The top was raised and lowered manually until 1991, when it became electrically operated.

The body of the Cabriolet did not change through the entire production run except for a larger fuel tank. It kept the pre-1980 style of rear lamp clusters. A space saver spare wheel was fitted from the outset, including 1978 pre-production models, unlike the saloon which did not adopt this until 1984. All Cabriolets from 1988 on left the factory fitted with a "Clipper" bodykit that featured smooth body-coloured bumpers, wheel-arch extensions, and side skirts.

Prior to the 1984 model year the highest standard specification Cabriolet was the GLI, which was essentially a GTI in all but name. It was only in late 1983 with the introduction of the 1984 model that an officially badged GTI version of the cabriolet finally became available.

Cabriolet special editions
Special editions of the Cabriolet included the Etienne Aigner, Carat, CC, Wolfsburg, and Best Seller models.

Golf GTD

Presented at the March 1982 Geneva Motor Show, the Golf GTD combined performance and economy. The car's appearance package and suspension were based on the Mk1 Golf GTI. The engine was a version of the 827 model diesel, with power boosted by a forced induction system. To make this power increase possible, more than 30 changes to the base engine were made, including increased oil circulation, a more efficient oil pump and reinforced or higher quality components such as head gasket and cylinder head. Due to the increased thermal load on the pistons, they were cooled from below by means of oil jets, and the engine was equipped with an oil-to-water heat exchanger on the flange of the oil filter element. The turbocharger was mounted between the engine and the firewall.

Regional variations

Volkswagen Caribe (Mexico, 1977–1987)

In May 1977, the Mk1 Golf was launched in Mexico as the Volkswagen Caribe. It came standard with a 4-speed manual transaxle and a 1.6 litre  carbureted engine. The car was an instant success. At first only the 5-door body was offered, but in 1978, the lineup expanded with the 3-door body. Two initial trim levels were offered: "Base" and "L", with the "GL" trim level added in 1979. 

The 1980 Caribe lineup remained essentially unchanged except for a slightly restyled front grille with squared type headlamps.

In 1981 an improved Caribe was offered to the Mexican market, with looks matching the recently face-lifted North American-spec Mk1 Golf: the Volkswagen Rabbit. New features included revised bumpers, new taillights and a new front grille design. A diesel engine became an option that year.

In 1983, the Caribe range got an improved dashboard designed for the 1980 European Golf. Trim levels were also updated, with the previous "Base" entry-level rebadged as the "Caribe C", the "GL" level unchanged, and the mid-level "L" trim level being dropped.

In 1984, inspired by the worldwide success of the Mk1 Golf GTI, VW Mexico produced its own "hot" derivative: the Caribe GT. This version featured an  1.8 L engine with dual-carburetor fuel delivery system, rather than the electronic fuel injection of the GTIs.

Close to the end of the model production, VW Mexico offered, through 1986 and 1987, three special Caribe versions: "City", "Pro" and "Plus":

The "Caribe City" was primarily based on the entry-level Caribe "C". It was offered only in Pearl Gray or Turquoise Blue paintwork and featured a distinctive "City" badge. The "Caribe Pro" was a somewhat downgraded version of the GTI-like Caribe GT. The "Pro" retained the sporty feel of the GT and was offered only with a 3-door body, with two paint choices: Tornado Red or Black. "PRO" label graphics were attached to the lower doors and the hatch. The "Caribe Plus" was the last special edition in the range. The "Plus" had GL level trim, and was offered only in Alpine White paintwork for the body colour and much of the trim, including the front grille and the bumpers (which were of the plastic-molded type sported by European Mk1 Golfs since 1980). The interior's upholstery and carpets were also Alpine White in this edition.

After 10 years of success, 1987 was the last production year for the Mexican Mk1 Golf-based Volkswagen Caribe series. The "Plus" special version could be considered the "Last Edition" Caribe, since it had a short production run before the discontinuation of the model lineup in March 1987, when the whole Caribe range was dropped in favor of the production and introduction in Mexico of the Golf MkII.

Volkswagen Rabbit/Golf (U.S.A./Canada)

The Golf Mk1 was first introduced to the United States in 1975, but in that market the car was called the Volkswagen Rabbit. These early US Rabbits were produced in Germany and exported to North America.

In 1978 Volkswagen began building the Rabbit at its Westmoreland plant. Former Chevrolet engineer James McLernon was chosen to run the factory, which was built to lower the cost of the Rabbit in North America by producing it locally. McLernon moved to "Americanize" the Golf/Rabbit (Volkswagen executive Werner Schmidt referred to the act as "Malibuing" the car) by softening the suspension and using cheaper materials for the interior. VW purists in America and company executives in Germany were displeased. For the 1983 model year the Pennsylvania plant went back to using stiffer shocks and suspension with higher-quality interior trim.

Rabbit Diesels arrived in mid-1977 and were originally German-built. During 1980, production was shifted to the Pennsylvania plant, with the most obvious change being a switch from round to square headlamps. The color schemes also changed; period testers noted a lower quality of materials being used, although fit and finish was as high as on German-made cars. The US-market 1.5-liter diesel had a claimed  at 5,000 rpm. This model was short-lived, with 1981 Rabbits receiving a facelift with wraparound turn signals and larger taillights, while the diesel engine was changed to a  1588 cc unit. The plant also began producing the GTI for the North American market in the fall of 1982, for the 1983 model year. 'Rabbits' were built in Pennsylvania until 1984. The first Volkswagen Caddy pick-up, based on the Mk1 Golf, was also created at the Pennsylvania plant.

Canada continued to import the German-made Rabbit until the 1981 model year when Volkswagen Canada began to import the US-made version.

The original U.S.-spec Golf saw use in a taxi fleet. The Yellow Cab Company of Lexington, Kentucky, bought eleven Rabbits in the late seventies as part of an effort to save money on fuel, estimating an annual savings of $135,000 in gasoline costs. Two other companies considered using the Rabbit as the basis for a taxicab. The Checker Motors Corporation and the Wayne Corporation both built prototype taxis using Rabbits with much longer wheelbases than factory. Checker built one prototype and Wayne built three, but neither project went into production.

For 1981 the gasoline powered Rabbit received a fuel injected  engine, an iteration used only in North America, which offered . The carburetted versions were discontinued.

The Volkswagen Rabbit GTI, the North American version of the high-performance Golf GTI, debuted in Canada in 1979 and the United States for 1983. Assembled from parts made in Mexico, Canada, Germany and the U.S. in Volkswagen's Westmoreland assembly plant, it had the same Mk1 chassis, and the same A1 body type as the Mk1 Golf GTI that had been on sale in Europe since 1976, with a few exceptions. Key distinct features of the Rabbit GTI were its squared front end styling, and its alloy "snowflake" wheels. The interior came in red or blue felt and leatherette trim. The squared styling of the front end, particularly the wraparound direction indicator lights, gave it added safety and slight improvement in performance. Under the hood, the engine was a JH 1.8 litre four-cylinder gasoline engine that ran on unleaded fuel, In addition to being marginally larger than the regular engine it also had lightened pistons, bigger valves, a higher compression, and a free-flow exhaust as well as other minor improvements. For 1984 the Rabbit GTI was back, now with an updated engine offering . In total, 30,000 of these 1.8 L Rabbit GTIs were built in Pennsylvania.

When the Rabbit GTI first appeared in Canada, it featured the 78 hp 1.5 L (1979) and 1.6 L (1980) K-Jetronic engine and wide ratio five-speed transmission. It was initially available in red, white, and black. These Canadian cars were German-built and were nearly identical in body shell and interior appearance to the  Golfs built in Europe. Unfortunately for enthusiasts, the entire drive-line and running gear was identical to the other Canadian versions. Five-MPH bumpers were fitted as well as anti-intrusion bars within the doors. The towing eye integral to the front of the European car was deleted as the crash-worthy bumper's shock absorbers had towing facilities as part of their design and the car had been crash-tested for Canada with the North American front apron. The car was very attractive but drove no better or worse than a Rabbit of the same era. Only with the arrival of the American GTI was a faster Golf available in Canada, and it was down  compared to the 1.8 L Golf GTI Mk1. A small number of European specification GTIs made it to Canada under an agreement with the government that allowed foreign soldiers training at Canadian military facilities to bring their personal vehicles with them. As a result of this, VW made available (for many years) all unique European model parts required through VW of Canada. It was thus possible, although expensive, to build a "real" GTI. Some enthusiasts did so based on the reputation of the European car.

Volkswagen CitiGolf (South Africa, 1984–2009)

From 1984 to 2009, Volkswagen of South Africa manufactured two variants of the Mk1 Golf; the five-door Citi Golf and the Volkswagen Caddy. Earlier, the original Golf Mk1 had been manufactured with petrol or diesel engines.

To celebrate the continued success of the Mk1 based Citi Golf in South Africa, on 22 September 2006 Volkswagen SA announced the limited edition Citi R powered by a 90 kW (120 hp/123 PS) 1.8L fuel injected engine with a five-speed manual transmission as well as a GTI trademark red outlined front grill.

The 2007 VW South Africa Citi Golf range starts with a standard Citi Golf, in either 1.4 or 1.6 litre fuel injected models. Variations of the standard version with different options packages included the Citi Rhythm, Citi.com and others. The range topper is the CitiRox, also available in 1.4i and 1.6i, made as sportier versions of the standard Citi to replace the previous sports version, Velociti and Citi Life. The later Citi Golfs feature modern amenities such as a new dashboard adapted from a Škoda Fabia, and minor body "facelifts" such as revised tail-light clusters.

The 2009 VW South Africa Citi Golf range consisted of four new models:
 CitiRox 1.4i and 1.6i
 CitiSport 1.4i and 1.6i
 TenaCiti 1.4i
 CitiStorm 1.4i

Production of the Citi Golf ended on 2 November 2009 after 377,484 cars had been built. The final 1000 vehicles manufactured were a special edition Citi Mk1 with a 1.6i engine. The colors available for the Citi Mk1 were "Shadow Blue" and "Black Magic Pearl".

Experimental versions and Specials

Volkswagen
Volkswagen used the Golf Mk1 as the basis of several experimental cars of their own. These included:
 ESVW II (1974). This was an experimental safety vehicle that included passive belts and airbags.

 Elektro Golf 1 (1976). An electrically powered prototype built by the factory. It was used for several years.
 RVW and IRVW (1). These two vehicles were experiments in turbo-Diesel engines. The IRVW also implemented extensive changes to the chassis to improve crashworthiness. Both vehicles were tested by the EPA in the United States from February 1977 to May 1978.
 Golf 1 CitySTROMer (1981). Another electrically powered prototype, this was a follow-on to the Electro Golf and the first CitySTROMer. Only 25 were made.
 Auto 2000 (1981). This streamlined, highly fuel efficient prototype was designed to preview the cars of the year 2000 and used the platform of the Golf Mk I.
 EVW II. This prototype adapted a 1982 Golf to an experimental two-shaft hybrid drive system that had both a petrol engine and a 5 kW electric motor.
 Seegolf (1983). This water-going Cabriolet was a special project of Ernst Fiala.

Artz/Nordstadt
Günter Artz was director of the Hannover Volkswagen dealer Autohaus Nordstadt. Artz and Nordstadt produced several specials that were either based on or had the appearance of the Golf Mk1 or its derivative models.
 The Nordstadt Golf by Artz, also known as the Super Rabbit, was a Porsche 928 with a custom body in the style of the Mk1 Golf built in 1979. It produced , could accelerate from 0–100 km/h (62 mph) in 7.6 seconds, 0–160 km/h (99 mph) in 18.9 seconds and could reach a top speed of 230 km/h (143 mph). It was featured in the December 1979 issue of Road & Track. Six were built. A second-generation model was based on the 928S.
Ten were produced.
 The Artz Cabrio and SuperCabrio were convertibles based on the two door Jetta. The donor car's B-pillar was retained in the Cabrio, while it was eliminated in the SuperCabrio.

Sbarro
Swiss fabricator Sbarro built several cars with the look of a Golf Mk1 but with greater performance. These included the following models:
 Golf Turbo (1983). This car had a  Porsche flat-six engine mounted amidships in a Golf Mk1 chassis. The engine was accessed by scissoring the rear sub-frame down, pushing the back of the car upwards.
 Sbarro 300S (1983). This Sbarro project mounted a Porsche 928 V8 driving the rear wheels in a Golf Mk1 body. Two were built.

Rinspeed
In 1979, Rinspeed released their Golf Turbo 1, and, in 1981, they unveiled the Aliporta, a modified Golf Mk1 with gull-wing doors.

ACM
In Italy the ACM company built a vehicle called the "Biagini Passo" from 1990 to 1993. This crossover-like car started with a Mk1 Cabriolet body and mounted the engine, transmission and Syncro four-wheel-drive system from the MkII Golf Country using a custom subframe. Approximately 65 were built.

Motorsports
In the late 1970s, the Mk1 Golf GTI was campaigned in a variety of international rallying events, taking wins at Sweden (1978, 1982, 1983), Monte Carlo (1980), Great Britain (1983), and Portugal (1984).

In 1981, drivers Alfons Stock and Paul Schmuck won the German Rally Championship in a Golf GTI Mk1. The bright green Golf, sponsored by Rheila, was nicknamed the "Rheila Frosch" (Rheila Frog). In its final iteration it was powered by a  Oettinger 16-valve engine.

See also
 Volkswagen Group A platform
 VDub

References

Further reading

External links

 
 

1980s cars
1990s cars
2000s cars
Cars introduced in 1974
Compact cars
Convertibles
Front-wheel-drive vehicles
Group 4 (racing) cars
Hatchbacks
Coupé utilities
Sedans
Golf 1
Italdesign vehicles